Let's Get Serious is an EP by Mike Viola & the Candy Butchers released in 1999 in anticipation of the Candy Butchers then-upcoming album Falling into Place.

Track listing
 "Killing Floor" – 4:04
 "Falling into Place" – 2:59
 "Cherubino" – 3:28
 "What Will You Do with Your Hands" – 3:41
 "I Want You to Come Home" – 3:02
 "Happy Birthday Risbee" – 2:32

1999 EPs
Mike Viola albums